Gossaigaon College, established in 1971, is a general degree undergraduate, coeducational college situated at Gossaigaon, in Kokrajhar district, Assam.

Departments

Science
Physics
Mathematics
Chemistry
Botany
Zoology

Arts
Assamese
Bodo
English
Hindi
History
Education
Economics
Philosophy
Political Science

References

External links
http://www.gossaigaoncollege.org

Universities and colleges in Assam
Colleges affiliated to Gauhati University
Educational institutions established in 1971
1971 establishments in Assam